The C-10 is a line and rail service of Cercanías Madrid commuter rail network, operated by Renfe Operadora. It runs from Villalba northwest Madrid to Fuente de la Mora, through the city center of Madrid, while trains can continue onwards to Madrid Barajas Airport. The line has been in operation since 2001.

Infrastructure
Like the rest of Cercanías Madrid lines, the C-10 runs on the Iberian gauge mainline railway system, which is owned by Adif, an agency of the Spanish government. All of the railway lines carrying Cercanías services are electrified at 3,000 volts (V) direct current (DC) using overhead lines. The trains on the line call at up to 21 stations, using the following railway lines, in order from west to east:

List of stations
The following table lists the name of each station served by line C-10 in order from northwest to east; the station's service pattern offered by C-10 trains; the transfers to other Cercanías Madrid lines; remarkable transfers to other transport systems; the municipality in which each station is located; and the fare zone each station belongs to according to the Madrid Metro fare zone system.

References

Cercanías Madrid